Benbrook is a city in Tarrant County, Texas, near Fort Worth.
Benbrook may also refer to:
Benbrook Glacier, a glacier in the Churchill Mountains
Benbrook Lake, a lake near the Texas city of the same name
Benbrook Field, an airfield also near the Texas city of the same name
Chuck Benbrook, an agricultural economist at Washington State University